The Citadel Outlets are an outlet mall in the City of Commerce, California along the Santa Ana Freeway southeast of Downtown Los Angeles, which features the Exotic Revival architecture of a tire factory, whose partial remnants the complex occupies, built in the style of an Assyrian castle of King Sargon II.

In 1929, architects Morgan, Walls and Clements, who also designed Los Angeles’ Mayan Theater, built the Samson Tire and Rubber Co. factory; the factory closed in 1978 and the Commerce government bought the site for $14 million in 1983. In 1990, Trammell Crow Co. was hired for the site's $118 million redevelopment into an outlet center and adjacent 201-room Wyndham Garden Hotel.

After the partnership defaulted on its ground lease the city sold the complex to Craig Realty bought for $50 million in July 2002, with the condition that Craig would double the size of the mall.

A  expansion was completed in 2010.

It is also the site of Black Friday on Thanksgiving, which led to longer lines since there are discounted prices on merchandise. There are some security measures implemented recently.

In 2019, there was a proposed expansion of shopping center that would include both hotel towers and monorail while linking the sprawling property. This focuses new development on three sites. It would also include construction of multiple new retail buildings. The two story building would be used for Adventure Experiential Retail.

In July 1, 2022, it would unveil “Los Angeles: Home of Champions”, with paying homage to Los Angeles’ world champion sports teams. This would feature Super Bowl LVI Champions, Los Angeles Rams, as well as World Series Champions. This would start through July 1 through Labor Day, September 6.

Proposed LA Metro Station 
As part of the LA Metro Gold Line Eastside Transit Corridor, a station at the Citadel Outlets is planned. The line is projected to break ground in 2029, with start of operations in 2035.

References

External links
"Samson Tire and Rubber Factory" at Pacific Coast Architecture Database

Outlet malls in the United States
Shopping malls in Southeast Los Angeles County, California
Commerce, California
Morgan, Walls & Clements buildings